Nong Prue is a district (amphoe) in the northeastern part of Kanchanaburi province, central Thailand.

The district is named after the Prue plant, Cyperus sp.

History
The area of Nong Prue was originally the village, Ban Nong Prue, Tambon Nong Ri of Bo Phloi district. Later it was upgraded to the sub-district (tambon) Nong Prue. The Interior Ministry split the two tambons Nong Prue and Nong Pla Lai from Bo Phloi District to establish the minor district (king amphoe) Nong Prue on 1 April 1992. A third tambon, Somdet Charoen, was later included in the new district as well. The minor district was upgraded to a full district on 11 October 1997.

Geography
Neighboring districts are (from the east clockwise) Lao Khwan, Bo Phloi, Si Sawat of Kanchanaburi province and Dan Chang of Suphanburi province.

Administration
The district is divided into three sub-districts (tambons), which are further subdivided into 43 villages (mubans). The township (thesaban tambon) Nong Prue covers parts of tambon Nong Prue. There are a further three tambon administrative organizations (TAO).

References

External links
amphoe.com
 Nong Prue district history (Thai)

Nong Prue